The list of shipwrecks in 1797 includes ships sunk, foundered, wrecked, grounded or otherwise lost during 1797.

January

11 January

14 January

18 January

21 January

Unknown date

February

1 February

3 February

7 February

18 February

23 February

25 February

Unknown date

March

10 March

20 March

24 March

28 March

Unknown date

April

14 April

16 April

26 April

Unknown date

May

18 May

19 May

Unknown date

June

1 June

Unknown date

July

16 July

18 July

31 July

Unknown date

August

2 August

10 August

29 August

31 August

Unknown date

September

1 September

3 September

6 September

11 September

12 September

14 September

Unknown date

October

11 October

15 October

19 October

20 October

28 October

Unknown date

November

2 November

3 November

6 November

10 November

14 November

16 November

18 November

19 November

Unknown date

December

1 December

12 December

15 December

17 December

20 December

25 December

Unknown date

Unknown date

References

1797